Alex Hamill (born 30 October 1961) is a Scottish footballer, who played for Heart of Midlothian, Hamilton Academical, Forfar Athletic, Cowdenbeath and East Fife.

References

1961 births
Living people
Footballers from Coatbridge
Scottish footballers
Association football fullbacks
Scottish Football League players
Tottenham Hotspur F.C. players
Heart of Midlothian F.C. players
Hamilton Academical F.C. players
Forfar Athletic F.C. players
Cowdenbeath F.C. players
East Fife F.C. players